Klub Sportowy Pogoń Mogilno is a football club from Mogilno, Poland. It was founded in 1923. They currently play in the fifth tier.

References
 Official website
 Pogoń Mogilno (90minut.pl)

Association football clubs established in 1923
Mogilno County
Football clubs in Kuyavian-Pomeranian Voivodeship
1923 establishments in Poland